Nathan John Owens (born March 9, 1984) is an American actor, model, and producer. Owens portrayed Cameron Davis on Days of Our Lives and was a regular as Jesse Morgan on the Lifetime comedic-drama series, Devious Maids.

Career
Owens made his foray into world of fashion working as a model. He has appeared in several issues of GQ, as well as many commercial and print campaigns for the Gap, Polo, Izod and Sperry. He also has the distinction of being the second African-American ever to be featured in a fragrance campaign for  Polo Ralph Lauren Big Pony.

Owens' on-camera career started when he appeared opposite Rihanna in the music video to her song, California King Bed and later, opposite Nicki Minaj in Va Va Voom.

In October 2012, it was announced that Owens had joined the cast of Days of Our Lives as a recast of Cameron Davis. Owens was released from his contract with Days of Our Lives in July 2013 and made his final appearance in November 2013. Owens was later accepted to ABC's Diversity Showcase. Owens joined the cast of Devious Maids for its third season in the role of Jesse Morgan, a character described as "a handsome military vet who returns stateside to settle back into civilian life." In 2016, Owens reprised the role of Jesse in the fourth and final season.

In September 2020, Owens joined the cast Batwoman in the recurring role of Ocean. He also starred in Ion Television's television film, The Christmas Sitters. In 2022, Owens joined the cast of 9-1-1: Lone Star in the recurring role of Julius Vega.

Filmography

Personal life
Nathan John Owens was born in Daly City, California. His family later relocated to Sacramento where he finished school. Once he started modeling in 2007 he shot a campaign with photographer Bruce Weber in New York City. That campaign inspired him to move to NYC. After living there for 6 months he booked a hosting job for an NBC subsidiary out in Los Angeles and relocated once again. He lives in Santa Monica, CA but spends most of his time in San Francisco and Sacramento.

References

External links

Nathan Owens on Instagram

Living people
1984 births
21st-century American male actors
American male soap opera actors
American male film actors
American male television actors
African-American male models
African-American models
American male models
African-American male actors
Male actors from San Francisco
21st-century African-American people
20th-century African-American people